The Gorai-Madhumati River ( Gôŗai-Modhumoti) is one of the longest rivers in Bangladesh and a distributary of the Ganges. In the upper reaches it is called the Gorai, and the name changes to Madhumati. Madhumati continuous stream through Kushtia, Jessore, Rajbari, Faridpur, Khulna, Pirojpur and Barguna districts in Bangladesh.

See also
 List of rivers in Bangladesh

References

Rivers of Bangladesh
Distributaries of the Ganges
Rivers in Buddhism
Rivers of Khulna Division
Rivers of Dhaka Division
Rivers of Barisal Division